Mhangura (formerly Mangula) is a small town and former mining community  in the Doma District of  Mashonaland West Province, in northern Zimbabwe.

Geography
The name was probably derived from the Shona word mhangura meaning "red metal" in reference to copper.

People
According to the 1982 census, Mhangura formerly had a population of 11,175.

Zimbabwean cricketer Natsai Mushangwe comes from Mhangura.

The runner Artwell Mandaza also lived in Mhangura.

The first manager of what was initially called Mangula mine, Mr "Bill" Wilson, became businessman of the year after he turned around the fortunes of Datsun, South Africa

Mining ghost town
In the 1960s the Messina Transvaal Development Company (MTD) developed what was at that time called the Mangula copper mine (MCM).

They registered the company, MTD (Mangula) Ltd, on the stock exchange. They also developed the nearly Silverside and Norah mines.

MTD also built the copper smelter and refinery at their Alaska mine site near Chinhoyi.

Soon after Zimbabwe's independence MTD sold their assets to ZMDC, a parastatal.

The Mhangura Copper Mines Ltd, a subsidiary of Zimbabwe Mining Development Corporation, operated one of the biggest copper mine in the country here. All mining was closed in the late 1990s, due to falling prices on the world copper market.

Mhangura has become an industrial/mining ghost town, with its water, power, and sanitation infrastructure failing.

See also
 Zimbabwe Mining Index

References
3. Mining in Zimbabwe from the 6th to the 21st centuries published by The Chamber of Mines of Zimbabwe ISBN 978-1-77906-6107

Populated places in Mashonaland West Province
Copper mining in Africa
Mining communities in Africa
Mining in Zimbabwe